"In a Sentimental Mood" is a 1935 jazz composition by Duke Ellington.

In a Sentimental Mood may also refer to:

 In a Sentimental Mood (Dr. John album)
 In a Sentimental Mood (Houston Person album) 
 In a Sentimental Mood: Mathis Sings Ellington